The 5.56×30mm MINSAS is a firearm cartridge manufactured by India's Ordnance Factory Board (OFB) for close-quarters combat use. OFB claims that its penetration rate is better than 9mm caliber. It is currently chambered in the Modern Sub Machine Carbine and Amogh carbine.

The MINSAS is being manufactured at Ammunition Factory Khadki in Pune.

History

Development
The first reports of the MINSAS being developed was from 2009 when the MSMC was announced to be in development.

See also
 FN 5.7×28mm
 HK 4.6×30mm

References

Pistol and rifle cartridges
Military cartridges